Bolesław Mołojec (pronounced ; born 9 February 1909, Henryków, Tomaszów Mazowiecki County – died 29 or 31 December 1942, Warsaw), known under noms de guerre "Edward" and "Długi", was a Polish communist activist and commander of International Brigades during the Spanish Civil War. 

He served in the leadership of the Communist Party of Poland's (KPP) youth organization in 1935-1936; disciplined by the Soviet leadership in 1936, a fact that later counted in his favour after Stalinist authorities had purged KPP. Mołojec put himself in charge of the PPR after the 1941 German invasion of the Soviet Union. He was assassinated by his own peers.

Biography

In his youth he studied and worked in Tomaszów Mazowiecki, he was also the organizer of anti-capitalist lectures and protests.

Before World War II, Mołojec volunteered for the Polish units of the International Brigades. He took the nom de guerre "Major Edward", became prominent in the Dabrowski Battalion, and ended up commanding XIII International Brigade.

In 1939 the Comintern put him in charge of the provisional leadership centre in Paris responsible for re-grouping the purged Polish communist movement. However, little was achieved in the atmosphere of suspicion surrounding the decimated KPP. In 1940 Mołojec was ordered to Moscow and attempts to re-form the KPP were abandoned by the Soviets.

Mołojec was attached to the Initiative Group parachuted into Nazi-occupied Poland in December 1941, to establish the Polish Workers' Party (PPR).  With Marceli Nowotko and Paweł Finder, he formed the leadership troika. He was in charge of the generally unsuccessful efforts to establish a military underground, the Gwardia Ludowa, and launch guerrilla warfare against the German occupation forces.

In November 1942, when Nowotko was killed in mysterious circumstances, Mołojec put himself in charge of the PPR. Some weeks later, Mołojec was executed on the orders of Finder, Fornalska, Władysław Gomułka and Franciszek Jóźwiak, held responsible for arranging Nowotko's murder, a charge that has never been entirely convincingly proven (see also Marceli Nowotko).

In the Polish People's Republic, Mołojec was for many years a nonperson whose role in the Spanish Civil War and the formation of the PPR and its military wing were concealed or glossed over.

Notes

1909 births
1942 deaths
People from Tomaszów Mazowiecki County
People from Piotrków Governorate
Communist Party of Poland politicians
Polish Workers' Party politicians
Polish Comintern people
Executed communists
Executed politicians
Polish resistance members of World War II
Polish people of the Spanish Civil War
Executed people from Łódź Voivodeship
International Brigades personnel
20th-century executions by Poland